Aşağı Öysüzlü (also, Aşağı Öksüzlü and Ashagy Oksyuzlyu) is a village and municipality in the Tovuz Rayon of Azerbaijan.  It has a population of 6,398.

References 

Populated places in Tovuz District